The symbols of Guadalajara are the coat of arms or seal and the municipal flag.

Flag 

The flag of the city of Guadalajara is the emblem that represents this city and is used by the town hall as representative symbol of the city.  The flag consists of 3 horizontal stripes, blue, yellow and blue respectively, in the central part of the yellow stripe is the Seal of Guadalajara conceived by the emperor Carlos V in 1539.

The design for the flag was ordered by Francisco Medina Asencio who was the governor of Guadalajara in 1967. The colors were taken from the towers of the metropolitan cathedral which was built in the middle of the 19th century of pumice by the Architect Manuel Gómez Ibarra to lighten them in case of earthquake, after the original towers were destroyed by a quake in 1818.  The colors are those that in a singular way represent the city, these colors can be found in the flowers of urban gardens of the city, urban equipment, taxis and the state traffic plates.

Coat of arms

The Coat of arms or Seal of Guadalajara consists of a blue field, a pine of sinople outlined, two lions rampantes of color, opposite to forehead and the legs on the trunk, embroidery is of gold, consists of seven arms of gules. For stamp, closed helmet and for cimera a flag of gules, loaded with a cross of Jerusalem to the one that uses as shaft a lance of the same color, the lambrequins are of gold and blue alternated.

The blue field means loyalty and serenity, the pine of sinople means noble thoughts, the lions sovereignty and warlike spirit, the arms mean protection, favor and purity of the feelings, honor to the Battle of Baeza against the Moors in 1227. The helmet represents a degree of nobility, victory in the combat, the cross of Jerusalem means that the conquerors were descendants of the gentlemen of the crusades, and the lance signifies strength that is tempered by prudence.

Charles V, Holy Roman Emperor, granted the title of city to Guadalajara and granted the shield in 1539.

See also
State flag of Jalisco

Flags of Mexico
Guadalajara, Jalisco
Symbols of Jalisco